Torrente: ¡Un torbellino de pasiones! (English title:Torrente: A Storm of Passion) is a Venezuelan telenovela written by Neida Padilla and Benilde Ávila which was produced by Venevisión in 2008.

On April 4, 2008, Venevisión started broadcasting Torrente weekdays at 9:00pm, replacing Arroz con Leche. The last episode was broadcast on September 9, 2008 with ¿Vieja yo? replacing it.

Maritza Bustamante and Luciano D'Alessandro starred as the protagonists, while Anabell Rivero and Félix Loreto starred as the antagonists.

Plot 
Ana Julia Briceño is an OB-GYN who is happily married to Reinaldo Galbadon, a pediatrician. She has everything she can ask for: a good job, a loving husband and the friendship provided by her best friend, Valeria Velutini. However, she cannot bear children due to a medical problem affecting her uterus. When she discusses the issue with her friend Valeria over Reinaldo's refusal to hire a surrogate, Valeria offers a suggestion: that she become the surrogate, on condition that Reinaldo does not find out about it.

Valeria then gets implanted with one of Ana Julia's eggs that has been fertilized by Reinaldo's sperm. However, the situation changes when Ana Julia is involved in a plane crash that leaves here with a severe case of memory loss. Everyone on board of the plane is considered dead. Devastated, Reinaldo and Valeria find comfort in each other's arms, leading them to spend the night together. After this, Valeria's pregnancy starts showing, and she tells Reinaldo that he is the father, without telling him the truth that Ana Julia is the biological mother of the child that she is carrying.

Meanwhile, in the Amazon jungle, Ana Julia is being cared for by Bayardo Santa Cruz, the man who rescued Ana Julia. After a turn of unfortunate events that sees Ana Julia land in jail, she finally recovers her memory and through the help of Bayardo, escapes back home. But when she finally reaches home, she is shocked to find out that her husband and best friend are a couple while, unknown to Reinaldo, they have built a life based on a lie. Ana Julia and Valeria now become rivals, as Ana Julia tries to regain what is rightfully hers while Valeria tries to hold onto the life that she has created with Reinaldo.

Cast

Starring 
 Maritza Bustamante as Ana Julia Briceño Mendizábal de Gabaldón
 Luciano D'Alessandro as Reinaldo Gabaldón Leal

Also starring 
 
 Eduardo Orozco as Juan "Juancho" Gabaldón Leal
 Zair Montes as Charí Santa Cruz
 Anabell Rivero as Valeria Velutini 
 Damián Genovese as Sebastián Gabaldón Leal
 Gioia Arismendi as Maruja Briceño Mendizábal de Gabaldón
 Iván Tamayo as Bayardo Santa Cruz
 Gioia Lombardini as Rebeca Mendizábal
 Carlos Villamizar as Lorenzo Gabaldón
 Marcos Moreno as Atilio Rengifo
 Jose Luis Useche as Hairo Vallejo
 Zhandra De Abreu as Paola Vettini
 Susej Vera as Corina Pereira de Gabaldón
 Gonzalo Cubero as Ortega
 Pedro Durán as Pacheko
 Félix Loreto as Cayo Gabaldón
 Verónica Ortiz as Nikdalia
 Carolina Motta as Baniba / María Ruíz
 Yina Vélez as Patrisia
 Jessika Grau as Verónica Méndez
 Beatriz Fuentes as Margarita
 Christian McGaffney as Benjamín
 Liliana Meléndez  as Rosita
 Marisol Matheus as Martina
 Vanesa Mendoza as Sofía
 Cesar Flores as Arturo Freitas
 Mayra Africano as Nueke/ Domitila
 Belén Peláez as Mariela
 Desideria D'Caro as Claudia Moreno
 Monica Pasqualotto as Tamara Domínguez
 Mauricio González as Omar Araulfo
 Rodolfo Drago as Yanis Alarcon

Venezuela broadcast
 Release dates, episode name & length, based on Venevisión's broadcast.

References

External links 

2008 telenovelas
2008 Venezuelan television series debuts
2008 Venezuelan television series endings
Venezuelan telenovelas
Spanish-language telenovelas
Venevisión telenovelas
Medical telenovelas
Television shows set in Venezuela